Nicolás Massia  (born 17 December 1980 in Montevideo) is a Uruguayan footballer who plays for Monagas SC.

Club career
Massia began his career in Uruguay playing for Danubio in the Primera División Uruguaya. He moved to Venezuela to play for Mineros de Guayana in 2006. Massia scored four goals for Mineros in a match against Estrella Roja during the 2007 season.

References

External links
 

1980 births
Living people
Uruguayan footballers
Danubio F.C. players
Uruguayan expatriate sportspeople in Venezuela
Expatriate footballers in Venezuela
Footballers from Montevideo
Sud América players
Association football midfielders